Albanian singer and songwriter Elvana Gjata has released two studio albums, three extended plays, 40 singles as a lead artist and 6 as a featured artist. Since the chart's inauguration in 2015, 12 of her singles have reached the top ten in Albania, with "Njesoj", "Lejla", "Forever Is Over", "Tavolina e mërzisë", "Fustani", "Thirr", "Loti" and "E di" topping the country's chart in 2016, 2017, 2019 and 2021, respectively.

Albums

Studio albums

Extended plays

Singles

As lead artist

As featured artist

Other charted songs

Guest appearances

Notes

References

External links 

Discography
Discographies of Albanian artists